Susanna and the Magical Orchestra
2004: Jolene (Rune Grammofon) Promo Single
2004: List of Lights and Buoys (Rune Grammofon)
2006: Melody Mountain (Rune Grammofon)
2009: 3 (Rune Grammofon, 2009)

Susanna 
2007: Sonata Mix Dwarf Cosmos (Rune Grammofon)
2008: Flower of Evil (Rune Grammofon)
2012: Wild Dog (Rune Grammofon)
2013: The Forester (SusannaSonata), Susanna & Ensemble neoN
 2016: Triangle (SusannaSonata)
 2018: Go Dig My Grave (SusannaSonata)

Susanna Wallumrød
2011: Jeg vil hjem til menneskene, Susanna Wallumrød synger Gunvor Hofmo (Grappa Music), with Morten Qvenild, Ståle Storløkken, Hans Magnus Ryan, Jo Berger Myhre & Erland Dahlen

With the Brotherhood of Our Lady
2019: Garden of Earthly Delights (SusannaSonata)

The Magical Orchestra has also contributed on the following compilations
2003: Money will Ruin Everything (Rune Grammofon)
2006: Until Human Voices Wake us, and we Drown (Rune Grammofon)

A selection of other albums Susanna has contributed on
2006 FRIKO: The Journey to Mandoola (C+C RECORDS)
2006 The White Birch: Come Up for Air (Rune Grammofon) – backing vocals on "Seer Believer", "June" and New Kingdom".
2008 Various: 50th Anniversary Tribute to the Artist Known as Prince (C+C Records) – backing vocals on "Purple Rain" (with The White Birch) and "Condition of the Heart" (album version).
2009 RAH Band: Definitive RAH Band Collection (Tool Boxx) – vocals on "Living for the Nitelife".
2011 Giovanna Pessi: If Grief Could Wait (ECM)
2014 Hval and Wallumrød: Meshes of Voice (SusannaSonata)

References

External links
SusannaSonata Music Label

Discographies of Norwegian artists
Pop music discographies